

General

See also 

 Speed limits by country
 Comparison of European road signs

References

Road transport in Europe
Traffic law